Persatuan Sepakbola Indonesia Pematangsiantar (simply known as Persesi Siantar or Persesi) is an Indonesian football club based in Pematangsiantar, North Sumatra. They currently compete in the Liga 3 and their homeground is Sangnawaluh Stadium.

Players

Current squad

References

External links
Persesi Siantar Instagram

 Pematangsiantar
Football clubs in Indonesia
Football clubs in North Sumatra
Association football clubs established in 1962
1962 establishments in Indonesia